Koman may refer to:

Küman, a municipality in Azerbaijan, also spelled Koman
Koman, Albania, a settlement in Albania
Koman culture, a medieval Albanian culture
Koman (hotel), in Kinosaki, Hyōgo prefecture, Japan
Koman Hydroelectric Power Station, in Albania
Koman, Iran, a settlement in Iran
Koman languages, a subgroup of the Nilo-Saharan language family

People
İlhan Koman, Turkish sculptor
Vladimir Koman, Hungarian footballer